Tout New Age is a collection of outtakes from A Sunny Day in Glasgow's debut album, Scribble Mural Comic Journal.  The band originally released it as a tour-only CD in 2007 and then released it in July 2007 as a digital download EP.

Track listing
All songs by A Sunny Day in Glasgow
 "They Made My Baby Care About Things That Didn't Matter" – 5:41
 "Laughter (Victims)" – 1:57
 "Summerlong Silences" – 3:08
 "The Ossifrage (Tout New Age)" – 3:12
 "Take Care of Yourself (Our Next Breath Will Be Our Last)" – 3:03
 "Yellow" – 4:54
 "Shame, Who Wouldn't Think It's Evil (Let's Get Beat Up)" – 5:28
 "Hugs & Kisses (Theme From A Sunny Day in Glasgow)" – 3:49

Personnel
Robin Daniels
Lauren Daniels
Ben Daniels
Jody Hamilton - horns
Jeddidiah Smith - mastering

References

External links
 notenuf.net EP Overview

2007 EPs
A Sunny Day in Glasgow albums